Aaron Martin may refer to:

 Aaron Martin (American football) (born 1941), former American football cornerback
 Aaron Martin (footballer, born 1989), English football defender for Port Vale
 Aaron Martin (footballer, born 1991), English football forward for Harrogate Town
 Aarón Martín (born 1997), Spanish footballer